MTV's Amp 2 is an Electronica compilation album released by MTV and Astralwerks. It features prominently collaborations and remixes between electronic musicians and rappers.

Track listing
 "The Rockafeller Skank" by Fatboy Slim
 "Release Yo' Delf" (Prodigy Mix) by Method Man
 "Battleflag" by Lo-Fidelity Allstars
 "Jungle Brother" (Aphrodite Mix) by Jungle Brothers
 "War" by Chuck D Vs. Ticc-Tacc ft. Ambersunshower
 "Sexy Boy" (Sex Kino Mix by Beck) by Air
 "Abandon Ship (Sharks and Mermaids)" by Kool Keith and Hardkiss
 "Digital" (Radio Edit) by Goldie and KRS-One
 "Genius" (Luke Vibert Mix) by Pitchshifter
 "Circles" (Album Edit) by Adam F
 "Brown Paper Bag" (Ronny Size Full Vocal Remix) by Roni Size/Reprazent
 "Bang On!" by Propellerheads
 "Piku Playground" (Live) by The Chemical Brothers (hidden track)

References

1998 compilation albums
Techno compilation albums
Electronic compilation albums
MTV series albums
Drum and bass albums
House music albums
Industrial compilation albums